The Knockout Stage of the 1995 Fed Cup Americas Zone Group I was the final stage of the Zonal Competition involving teams from the Americas. Those that qualified for this stage placed first and second in their respective pools.

The four teams were then randomly drawn into a two-stage knockout tournament, with the winner advancing to the World Group II Play-offs.

Draw

Semifinals

Mexico vs. Colombia

Paraguay vs. Brazil

Final

Mexico vs. Paraguay

  advanced to the World Group II Play-offs, where they were drawn against . However, they lost 0–5, and thus returned to the Americas Zone Group I in 1996.

See also
Fed Cup structure

References

External links
 Fed Cup website

1995 Fed Cup Americas Zone